Velichovky is a spa municipality and village in Náchod District in the Hradec Králové Region of the Czech Republic. It has about 700 inhabitants.

Administrative parts

The village of Hustířany is an administrative part of Velichovky.

Geography
It lies in the East Elbe Table.

History
The first written mention of Velichovky is from 1389.

Economy
Velichovky is known for a peat spa, which was founded in 1897. It focuses on rehabilitation and treatment of musculoskeletal disorders.

Notable people
Bavor Rodovský mladší of Hustířany (c. 1526 – c. 1600), alchemist

Twin towns – sister cities

Velichovky is twinned with:
 Jedlina-Zdrój, Poland

References

External links

Villages in Náchod District
Spa towns in the Czech Republic